Ghaath is a 2000 Indian Hindi-language crime drama film directed by Akashdeep and produced by Kumar Mohan. The film stars Manoj Bajpayee, Tabu and Om Puri in pivotal roles and Raveena Tandon in a special appearance.

Plot
Krishna Patil aspires to become a police officer and impresses Ajay Pandey of the Police Academy. However, a local gangster Romesh Bhagwat Dada alias Maamu does not want him to pass the Academy and has him disqualified. Enraged by this Patil drinks heavily and is arrested after a scuffle with Ishwar Mohanlal Ghodbole, a corrupt cop for whom "police" is an acronym for Power, Order Liar, Incompetent, Corrupt and Encounter. It is only when Patil's father bribes him does Ghodbole release him. Patil becomes disillusioned of the system in general. One day he meets Kavita Chaudhary who recently lost her father and shares Patil's view of the system. They begin a relationship.

Patil's sister Mansi marries Divakar. Soon after their marriage, the couple dies when their building collapses. The building was constructed by Maamu, who has the Municipal Officer Khairnar killed after he refuses to hush up the inquiry. Patil learns of this and together with Chaudhary and his friends battle the gangster.

Cast
 Manoj Bajpayee as Krishna Patil
 Tabu as Kavita Chaudhary
 Om Puri as Ajay Pandey
 Aparna Bhatnagar as Suman Ajay Pandey
 Anupam Kher as Ramakant Patel
 Arshad Warsi as Divakar
 Sheeba as Mansi Patil
 Mukesh Tiwari as Ishwar Mohanlal Ghodbole
 Irrfan Khan as Romesh Bhagwat Dada alias Maamu
 Johnny Lever as Screwdriver
 Makarand Deshpande as Happy Singh
 Mehul Buch as Hiten
 Sachin Khedekar as Khairnar
 Tinnu Anand as Vilas Rao
 Raveena Tandon in a special appearance in "Baba Meri Ye Jawani"
 Narayani Shastri as Varsha Khainar (Khainar's daughter)
 Raju Mavani as Salim Haatela
 Daya Shankar Pandey as Mamu Goon

Production
Akashdeep directed the film, produced under the banner of K. Bhagyalakshmi Pictures. This was the first film in which Khan and Kher appeared together. Initially, Akashdeep was not pleased with Khan's acting and was planning to replace him. It was on the insistence of Bajpayee that Akashdeep retained him. Bajpayee was acting with Khan for the first time, so was Tabu. Raveena Tandon made a special appearance in the film.

Soundtrack
The music for the soundtrack is composed by Anu Malik excepting one instrumental track by Salim–Sulaiman. Lyrics are written by Sameer.

Ronjita Das of Rediff.com opined that the film's music had "nothing to remember". Rashtriya Sahara called the soundtrack "excellent". Sify found the music "grating".

Reception
In her review for Rediff.com, Ronjita Das called the film a replay of Shool (1999), a previous film of Bajpayee, and noted that Johnny Lever had been totally wasted. Sify likened the film to a "routine commercial potboiler" and noted that the "production values aren't too high". It felt that Bajpayee had overacted in certain places and Tabu fell "prey to the mediocrity of the script". A review in Rashtriya Sahara noted that the film's cast was "represented by an impressive line-up of reputed actors".

References

External links

2000s Hindi-language films
2000 films
2000 crime drama films
Indian crime drama films
Films shot in Mumbai
Films scored by Salim–Sulaiman
Films scored by Anu Malik